The 2019 Kremlin  Cup (also known as the 2019 VTB Kremlin Cup for sponsorship reasons) was a professional tennis tournament played on indoor hard courts. It was the 30th edition of the Kremlin Cup for the men and the 24th edition for the women. The tournament was part of the ATP Tour 250 series of the 2019 ATP Tour, and of the Premier Series of the 2019 WTA Tour. It took place at the Ice Palace Krylatskoye in Moscow, Russia, from 14 October through 20 October 2019.

Points and prize money

Point distribution

Prize money 

*per team

ATP singles main-draw entrants

Seeds

 Rankings are as of October 7, 2019

Other entrants
The following players received wildcards into the singles main draw:
  Alen Avidzba 
  Evgeny Donskoy
  Alibek Kachmazov

The following players received entry from the qualifying draw:
  Artem Dubrivnyy
  Damir Džumhur
  Egor Gerasimov
  Lukáš Rosol

The following player received entry as a lucky loser:
  Nikola Milojević

Withdrawals
Before the tournament
  Daniil Medvedev

ATP doubles main-draw entrants

Seeds 

1 Rankings are as of October 7, 2019

Other entrants 
The following pairs received wildcards into the doubles main draw:
  Savriyan Danilov /  Roman Safiullin
  Evgeny Donskoy /  Andrey Rublev

WTA singles main-draw entrants

Seeds

 Rankings are as of October 7, 2019

Other entrants
The following players received wildcards into the singles main draw:
  Belinda Bencic
  Anna Kalinskaya

The following players received entry from the qualifying draw:
  Jana Čepelová
  Kirsten Flipkens 
  Varvara Gracheva
  Kaia Kanepi

Withdrawals
Before the tournament
  Simona Halep → replaced by  Ons Jabeur
  Johanna Konta → replaced by  Svetlana Kuznetsova
  Anett Kontaveit → replaced by  Anastasia Potapova 
  Petra Kvitová → replaced by  Polona Hercog
  Garbiñe Muguruza → replaced by  Kristina Mladenovic
  Markéta Vondroušová → replaced by  Veronika Kudermetova

WTA doubles main-draw entrants

Seeds 

1 Rankings are as of October 7, 2019

Other entrants 
The following pair received a wildcard into the doubles main draw:
  Alina Charaeva /  Sofya Lansere

Champions

Men's singles

  Andrey Rublev  def  Adrian Mannarino, 6–4, 6–0

Women's singles

  Belinda Bencic def.  Anastasia Pavlyuchenkova, 3–6, 6–1, 6–1

Men's doubles

  Marcelo Demoliner /  Matwé Middelkoop def.  Simone Bolelli /  Andrés Molteni, 6–1, 6–2

Women's doubles

  Shuko Aoyama /  Ena Shibahara def.  Kirsten Flipkens /  Bethanie Mattek-Sands, 6–2, 6–1

References

External links
 

2019
Kremlin Cup
Kremlin Cup
Kremlin Cup
Kremlin Cup